Mark Alan Dewey (born January 3, 1964 in Grand Rapids, Michigan) is a former Major League Baseball player. He is currently a pitching coach for the Brevard County Manatees, located in Viera, Florida. The Manatees are the Class A-Advanced (High-A) Minor League Baseball affiliate of the Milwaukee Brewers. His prior coaching experience was with the Washington Wild Things, an independent professional baseball team in the Frontier League, and at Emory & Henry College in southwestern Virginia. Born in Grand Rapids, Dewey played for the Grand Valley State University Lakers. In 1987, he struck out 87 batters in 97.2 innings. He was a 6'0" right-handed relief pitcher who played six season in the major leagues with the San Francisco Giants (1990, 1995–96), New York Mets (1992), and Pittsburgh Pirates (1993–94). On June 2, 1987, Dewey was drafted by the Giants in the 23rd round of the 1987 amateur draft. He appeared in 205 major league games and had a lifetime record of 12–7 (.632 winning percentage) with 168 strikeouts, 70 games finished and 8 saves. His lifetime earned run average was 3.65 for an Adjusted ERA+ of 110. His best season was 1993 when he had 7 saves for the Pirates in 21 games and maintained an impressive 2.36 ERA for an Adjusted ERA+ of 171. In his final season, Dewey appeared in 78 games for the Giants—3rd most in the National League. Dewey earned $225,000 in his final season in the big leagues. In 1995, Dewey was inducted into the Grand Valley State University Athletic Hall of Fame.

Dewey was involved in a notable controversy on July 28, 1996, when he refused to participate with his teammates in a pregame ceremony intended to support research of a cure for AIDS. As part of "Until There's A Cure Day", members of the Giants wore AIDS awareness ribbons on their uniforms and stood in a group shaped like that symbol during speeches by Giants owner Peter Magowan and San Francisco Mayor Willie Brown. Dewey refused to take the field for the ceremony, and he wore his ribbon sideways (which would have resembled the Icthys, a popular symbol meant to represent Jesus in Christian culture). He cited religious reasons for his refusal, stating that the ceremony was "against [his] Christian principles" and voicing the belief that homosexuality is a sin.

References

External links

Major League Baseball pitchers
Baseball players from Grand Rapids, Michigan
New York Mets players
Pittsburgh Pirates players
San Francisco Giants players
Nashville Sounds players
Grand Valley State Lakers baseball players
1964 births
Living people
Aiken Foxhounds players
Everett Giants players
Clinton Giants players
San Jose Giants players
Shreveport Captains players
Phoenix Firebirds players
Tidewater Tides players
Buffalo Bisons (minor league) players
American expatriate baseball players in Australia